Swipe may refer to:

 Swipe (barbershop), a music arranging technique
 Swipe (breakdance move)
 Swipe (comics), a technical term
 Swipe (dice game)
 Swipe (magazine), a free fortnightly in London, UK
 swIPe (protocol), an IP network security feature 
 Swipe file, a template used in marketing and copywriting
 Swipe card, or magnetic stripe card
 Swipe (novel), 2012, by Evan Angler
 Swipe, a fictional band from the movie Tamara Drewe
Pointing device gesture, described as "swipe right", "swipe left", or 'swipe up"

See also 
 Swype, a virtual keyboard for touchscreen devices
 Sluicing, grammatical device for omitting words